Jennifer Allison is an American author of mystery novels who is best known as the author of the Gilda Joyce children's series of books.

Born Jennifer Allison Brostrom, she grew up in Saline, Michigan and is a 1984 graduate from Saline High School. Jennifer holds a BA from the University of Michigan, where she attended on a music scholarship, but soon became more interested in literature and writing. She also holds an M.F.A. from American University.  Her first book was written while she was living in San Francisco, California and was published in July 2005.  She currently resides in Chicago, Illinois.

Bibliography

Gilda Joyce

 Gilda Joyce, Psychic Investigator (2005) , 
 Gilda Joyce: The Ladies of the Lake (2006) , 
 Gilda Joyce: The Ghost Sonata (2007) 
 Gilda Joyce: The Dead Drop (2009) , 
 Gilda Joyce, Psychic Investigator: The Bones of the Holy (2011) ,

Iggy Loomis 

 Iggy Loomis, Superkid in Training (2014) 
 Iggy Loomis, A Hagfish Called Shirley (2014)

Other work

 Fear (2010)

References 

American University alumni
University of Michigan alumni
Living people
1966 births
American women novelists
People from Saline, Michigan
Novelists from Michigan
21st-century American novelists
21st-century American women writers